Calcitonin gene-related peptide (CGRP) is a member of the calcitonin family of peptides consisting of calcitonin, amylin, adrenomedullin, adrenomedullin 2 (intermedin) and calcitonin‑receptor‑stimulating peptide. Calcitonin is mainly produced by thyroid C cells whilst CGRP is secreted and stored in the nervous system. This peptide, in humans, exists in two forms: CGRP alpha (α-CGRP or CGRP I), and CGRP beta (β-CGRP or CGRP II). α-CGRP is a 37-amino acid neuropeptide and is formed by alternative splicing of the calcitonin/CGRP gene located on chromosome 11. β-CGRP is less studied. In humans, β-CGRP differs from α-CGRP by three amino acids and is encoded in a separate, nearby gene. The CGRP family includes calcitonin (CT), adrenomedullin (AM), and amylin (AMY).

Function 

CGRP is produced in both peripheral and central neurons. It is a potent peptide vasodilator and can function in the transmission of nociception. In the spinal cord, the function and expression of CGRP may differ depending on the location of synthesis. CGRP is derived mainly from the cell bodies of motor neurons when synthesized in the ventral horn of the spinal cord and may contribute to the regeneration of nervous tissue after injury. Conversely, CGRP is derived from dorsal root ganglion when synthesized in the dorsal horn of the spinal cord and may be linked to the transmission of pain. In the trigeminal vascular system, the cell bodies on the trigeminal ganglion are the main source of CGRP. CGRP is thought to play a role in cardiovascular homeostasis and nociception. In the heart, CGRP acts as a chronotrope by increasing heart rate. Apart from these attributes, CGRP is known to modulate the autonomic nervous system and plays a role in ingestion.

CGRP has moderate effects on calcium homeostasis compared to its extensive actions in other areas, such as the autonomic nervous system.

Appetite 
As a neuropeptide, CGRP acts as an appetite suppressant and contributes to gastric acid secretion. It also functions in temperature homeostasis, increases heart rate, and plays a role in the release of the pituitary hormones in a paracrine manner. Because of these characteristics, it has been said that CGRP functions more as a neurotransmitter than a hormone.

Stem cell mobilization 
CGRP has a role in human stem cells mobilization. In investigations carried out during last five years, treatment with CGRP resulted in significantly increased CGRP levels in the bone marrow extracellular fluid and substantially increased the number of HSCs mobilized by G-CSF.  The results performed on different experiments by the same research group led to the conclusion that G-CSF-induced HSC mobilization is regulated by the nociceptor nerve-derived neuropeptide CGRP. This peptide exerts its effect on HSC mobilization by Ramp 1 pathway.

Receptors 

CGRP mediates its effects through a heteromeric receptor composed of a G protein-coupled receptor called calcitonin receptor-like receptor (CALCRL) and a receptor activity-modifying protein (RAMP1). CGRP receptors are found throughout all the body, suggesting that the protein may modulate a variety of physiological functions in all major systems (e.g., respiratory, endocrine, gastrointestinal, immune, and cardiovascular). The extracellular loop number 2 is fundamental for ligand induced activation, with key interactions of R274/Y278/D280/W283.

Regulation 
Regulation of the calcitonin gene-related peptide (CGRP) gene is in part controlled by the expression of the mitogen-activated protein kinases (MAPK) signaling pathway, cytokines such as TNFα and iNOS.

5HT1 receptor agonists, such as sumatriptan, increase intracellular calcium, which cause decreases in CGRP promoter activity.

CGRP receptor is found in myelinated A-fibers axon which is required for ligand specificity and function of the receptor. The CGRP receptor has three subunits: receptor activity-modifying protein 1 (RAMP1), calcitonin-like receptor (CLR) and receptor component protein (RCP). The complex central receptor is the G protein-coupled receptor calcitonin receptor-like receptor (CALCRL) which is necessary for CGRP and adrenomedullin (AM receptors). For function CGRP, CALCRL must coincide with RAMP1 where the ligand-binding domain of CGRP is located. It also includes two cytoplasmic proteins that associate with the CALCRL-RAMP1 to form signal transduction. CALCRL contains the Gα subunit, which activates adenylyl cyclase and cAMP-dependent signaling pathways. Receptor-mediated transduction elevates in intracellular cAMP activate protein kinase A, which results in the phosphorylation of multiple targets, including potassium- sensitive ATP channels (KATP channels), extracellular signal-related kinases and transcription factors such as cAMP-responsive element-binding protein (CREB). In smooth muscle of neurovascular region, the elevation of cAMP upon CGRP activation results in vasodilation of the blood vessel. Chronic exposure to CGRP causes degradation of lysosomes.

Research 

Increased levels of CGRP have been reported in migraine and temporomandibular joint disorder patients as well as a variety of other diseases such as cardiac failure, hypertension, and sepsis.

There is mounting evidence to suggest that CGRP may be beneficial in preventing the development of hypertension and cardiovascular pathologies associated with hypertension. Prophylactic therapy with calcitonin gene‐related peptides (CGRPs) may have unknown fertility consequences for women of child bearing age. This is of particular concern, as females (16.6%) are more genetically predisposed to migraine than are males (7.5%).

Preclinical evidence suggests that, during a migraine, activated primary sensory neurons (meningeal nociceptors) in the trigeminal ganglion release CGRP from their peripherally projecting nerve endings located within the meninges. This CGRP then binds to and activates CGRP receptors located around meningeal vessels, causing vasodilation, mast cell degranulation, and plasma extravasation. Human observations have further implicated the role of CGRP in the pathophysiology of migraine. Activation of primary sensory neurons in the trigeminal vascular system in humans can cause the release of CGRP. During some migraine attacks, increased concentrations of CGRP can be found in both saliva and in plasma drawn from the external jugular vein. Furthermore, intravenous administration of alpha-CGRP is able to induce headache in individuals susceptible to migraine.

Medicines 
New medicines are now on the market that contain antibodies against either CGRP itself, or its receptor. They are called monoclonal antibodies (MABs) and are large molecules that do not cross the blood-brain-barrier. They typically are not metabolized by the liver and have little direct impact on the metabolism of more conventional small-molecule drugs. They also tend to have relatively long half-lives in the body, but must be given parenterally (preferably by injection) due to very poor absorption from the digestive tract. They have been proved to be effective in people who experience migraine headaches, both with and without aura, and both episodic and chronic. These are the first class of preventive medications originally designed and approved for people with migraine. Monoclonal means all the antibodies are made from the same genetic material, although different MABs may derive from different sources, e.g. from hamster ovarian cells, from yeast cells or from humanized cell cultures. The antibodies are also made repeatedly to make them all identical, which results in difficult and relatively expensive production lines. Antibodies are proteins that counter or interfere with very specific parts of another protein or the site where a protein is supposed to bind to the receptor. Most commonly thought of in being used to prevent or fight off infections.

The first approved by the FDA is called erenumab (trade name Aimovig), produced by pharmaceutical company Amgen and Novartis. It interacts with the CGRP receptor. It is injected once monthly with a dose of 70 or 140 mg. Few adverse effects were reported (most related to injection site reactions) and patients had a significant reduction in migraines.

The second approved by the FDA is called fremanezumab (trade name Ajovy), produced by the Teva pharmaceutical company. It interacts with the CGRP protein, whose expression is related to migraine attacks. It may be administered monthly or every three months, giving options for users. Trials have shown a reduction of greater than 50% of migraine days for those who responded. There were few significant side effects during trials, most related to injection site reactions.

The third approved by the FDA is called galcanezumab (trade name Emgality), produced by the Eli Lilly Company. It interacts with the CGRP protein, whose expression is related to migraine attacks. It is injected once a month, after the first month having a double dose. The main side effects are injection site reactions.

Approved by the FDA in February 2020, ubrogepant is an oral medication manufactured by Allergan.

Also FDA approved in February 2020, eptinezumab (Vyepti), is an intravenous migraine prophylactic medication manufactured by Lundbeck.

References

External links 
 

Neuropeptides